The men's sprint C-2 (canoe double) 200 metres competition at the 2018 Asian Games was held from 31 August to 1 September 2018.

Schedule
All times are Western Indonesia Time (UTC+07:00)

Results

Heats
 Qualification: 1–3 → Final (QF), Rest → Semifinal (QS)

Heat 1

Heat 2

Semifinal
 Qualification: 1–3 → Final (QF)

Final

References

External links
Official website

Men's C-2 200 metres